The City of Cape Town is the local government of Cape Town and surrounding areas. As of the 2011 census, it had a population of 3,740,026.

History

Cape Town first received local self-government in 1839, with the promulgation of a municipal ordinance by the government of the Cape Colony. When it was created, the Cape Town municipality governed only the central part of the city known as the City Bowl, and as the city expanded, new suburbs became new municipalities, until by 1902 there were 10 separate municipalities in the Cape Peninsula. During the 20th century, many of the inner suburban municipalities became unsustainable; in 1913 the first major unification took place when the municipalities of Cape Town, Green Point and Sea Point, Woodstock, Mowbray, Rondebosch, Claremont, Maitland, and Kalk Bay were unified to create the first City of Cape Town. In 1927 the municipality of Wynberg was also merged with Cape Town, with the result that all of the Southern Suburbs were incorporated into the City.

Many new municipalities were established during the 20th century. Durbanville achieved municipal status in 1901, Goodwood in 1938, Parow in 1939, Bellville and Fish Hoek in 1940, Pinelands in 1948, Kuils River in 1950, Milnerton in 1955, Kraaifontein in 1957, Gordon's Bay in 1961, Brackenfell in 1970. In 1979 Bellville was upgraded to city status. The areas not included in a municipality were governed by divisional councils. Most of the Cape metropolitan area fell under the Divisional Council of the Cape, while the eastern parts around Brackenfell, Kuils River and the Helderberg area formed part of the Divisional Council of Stellenbosch, and an area in the northeast around Kraaifontein formed part of the Divisional Council of Paarl.

In earlier years the right to vote in local elections was not restricted by race (see Cape Qualified Franchise), but the policies of the apartheid government aimed for complete segregation of local government. A 1962 amendment to the Group Areas Act introduced management committees for the areas designated for coloured and Indian residents. These management committees were subordinate to the existing local authorityeither a municipality or the divisional council. From 1972 no new non-white voters could be registered as voters for municipal or divisional councils, and existing non-white voters lost their voting rights when a management committee was established for the area where they lived.

In 1982 the Black Local Authorities Act created elected town councils for black communities. Five such councils were established in the Cape metropolitan areas. They were generally regarded as under-resourced and unsustainable, and were opposed by the United Democratic Front and other civic organisations. Turnout in BLA elections was very low.

In 1987 the divisional councils of the Cape, Paarl and Stellenbosch were dissolved and the Western Cape Regional Services Council (RSC) was created in their place. The RSC councils were indirectly elected, consisting of representatives nominated by all the local authorities within its area, including municipalities, management committees and town councils. The Cape Rural Council represented the rural areas of the RSC that were not included in any local authority. Also in 1987, an act of the House of Assembly allowed the creation of local councils for white communities in peri-urban areas.

Thus at the end of apartheid in 1994, there were over 50 different local authorities in existence in the metropolitan area, listed below.

 Western Cape Regional Services Council (RSC)
 Cape Rural Council
 Cities
 City of Cape Town
 City of Bellville
 Municipalities
 Brackenfell Municipality
 Durbanville Municipality
 Fish Hoek Municipality
 Goodwood Municipality
 Gordon's Bay Municipality
 Kraaifontein Municipality
 Kuils River Municipality
 Milnerton Municipality
 Parow Municipality
 Pinelands Municipality
 Simon's Town Municipality
 Somerset West Municipality
 Strand Municipality
 Management Committees (indicating in brackets the local authority to which they were subordinated)
 Athlone and District MC (City of Cape Town)
 Atlantis MC (RSC)
 Belhar MC (RSC)
 Cravenby MC (RSC)
 Elsie's River MC (RSC)
 Grassy Park MC (RSC)
 Kensington MC (City of Cape Town)
 Kraaifontein MC (Kraaifontein Municipality)
 Macassar MC (RSC)
 Matroosfontein/Nooitgedacht MC (RSC)
 Melton Rose/Blue Downs/Delft MC (RSC)
 Mitchells Plain MC (City of Cape Town)
 Morningstar MC (Durbanville Municipality)
 Ocean View MC (RSC)
 Proteaville MC (City of Bellville)
 Ravensmead MC (Parow Municipality)
 Retreat/Steenberg MC (City of Cape Town)
 Rylands Estate MC (City of Cape Town)
 Sarepta MC (Kuils River Municipality)
 Schotschekloof MC (City of Cape Town)
 Scottsdene MC (RSC)
 Sir Lowry's Pass MC (RSC)
 Strand MC (Strand Municipality)
 Strandfontein MC (City of Cape Town)
 Temperance Town MC (Gordon's Bay Municipality)
 Wittebome/Wynberg MC (City of Cape Town)
 Woodstock/Walmer Estate/Salt River MC (City of Cape Town)
 Town Councils
 Crossroads Town Council
 iKapa Town Council (Langa, Gugulethu and Nyanga)
 Lingelethu West Town Council (Khayelitsha)
 Lwandle Town Council
 Mfuleni Town Council
 Local Councils
 Atlantis Industria LC
 Bloubergstrand LC
 Constantia LC
 Kommetjie LC
 Llandudno LC
 Melkbosstrand LC
 Noordhoek LC
 Ottery East LC
 Scarborough LC
 Mamre Board of Management

As part of the post-1994 reforms, municipal government experienced a complete overhaul. The existing local authorities, political parties, ratepayers' organisations, and community organisations were brought together into a negotiating forum. This forum agreed on the creation of a two-level local government system consisting of multiple transitional metropolitan substructures (TMSs), brought together in a transitional metropolitan council named the Cape Metropolitan Council (CMC). The CMC would replace the Regional Services Council and take over its responsibilities; it would also be responsible for metro-level planning and co-ordination, improving service delivery in disadvantaged areas, and cross-subsidization of poorer areas with revenue from affluent areas. Initially, in a period called the "pre-interim phase", the existing local authorities would become TMSs but their councils would be replaced by councillors nominated by the members of the negotiating forum. This agreement came into effect, and the pre-interim phase began, on 1 February 1995.

The second phase of the transformation, known as the "interim phase" began on 29 May 1996 when local elections were held. The pre-interim TMSs were dissolved, and six new TMSs were established covering the whole metropolitan area: City of Cape Town (Central), City of Tygerberg, South Peninsula Municipality, Blaauwberg Municipality, Oostenberg Municipality, and Helderberg Municipality. The Cape Metropolitan Council continued with its coordinating functions.

In 1998 Parliament enacted legislation (the Municipal Structures Act) determining the final form of local government in post-apartheid South Africa. This legislation determined that metropolitan areas would be governed by unified metropolitan municipalities. Local elections were held on 5 December 2000; the Cape Metropolitan Council and the six interim TMSs were dissolved and replaced by the unified City of Cape Town. It is for this reason that the City of Cape Town is sometimes referred to as the "Unicity". At the time of the 2000 election the northern boundary of the metropolitan area was also extended to include Philadelphia, Klipheuwel, and the surrounding farmland.

The current municipality covers Cape Point in the south-west, Gordon's Bay in the south-east, and Atlantis in the north, and includes Robben Island. The remote Prince Edward Islands are deemed to be part of the City of Cape Town, specifically of ward 115.

Politics and government

Council 

Cape Town is governed by a 231-member city council elected in a system of mixed-member proportional representation. The city is divided into 116 wards, each of which elects a councillor by first-past-the-post voting. The remaining 115 councillors are elected from party lists so that the total number of councillors for each party is proportional to the number of votes received by that party.

The makeup of the council after the 2021 election is shown in the following table.

The speaker of the council is Felicity Purchase of the Democratic Alliance.

The council is divided into 24 subcouncils which deal with local functions for between three and six wards. A subcouncil consists of the ward councillors and a similar number of proportionally-elected councillors assigned to the subcouncil. A subcounil is chaired by one of the councillors and appoints a manager to run its day-to-day business. A subcouncil does not have any inherent responsibilities in law, but it is entitled to make recommendations to the City Council about anything that affects its area. The City Council may also delegate responsibilities to the subcouncils.

Executive

The executive authority for the city is vested in an Executive Mayor who is elected by the council. The mayor appoints a mayoral committee whose members oversee various portfolios. A City Manager is appointed as the non-political head of the city's administration.

With the Democratic Alliance (DA) having won an absolute majority of council seats in the election of 1 November 2021, its mayoral candidate Geordin Hill-Lewis, who had been a Member of Parliament since 2011, was elected.

The Mayoral Committee consists of 10 members who are appointed by the Executive Mayor. Each member manages a different area of the local government.

The current city manager is Lungelo Mbandazayo. He had been the acting city manager since the former city manager Achmat Ebrahim, who was appointed in April 2006, resigned in January 2018 amid misconduct allegations. He was formally appointed city manager in April 2018.

The local municipality was one of the four to have passed the 2009-10 audit by the Auditor-General of South Africa, who deemed it to have a clean administration.

Electoral history

The City of Cape Town Metropolitan Municipality in its present form took shape after the 2000 municipal elections. The old Central Cape Town MLC council had been governed by the New National Party (NNP), but they were losing support to the African National Congress (ANC) and the Democratic Party (DP). Fearing further losses, the NNP agreed to contest the upcoming local election in December 2000 together with the DP by forming the Democratic Alliance (DA), with DP and NNP members running as DA candidates. The DA won Cape Town with an outright majority, and Peter Marais, also a senior member of the provincial NNP, became mayor of the unicity. However, DA leader Tony Leon's attempt to remove Marais from his position in 2001 caused the disintegration of the alliance, and NNP came to ally with the ANC. Marais was replaced as mayor by Gerald Morkel, but Morkel was himself soon ousted during the October 2002 local floor crossing period after a large number of DA councillors had defected to the NNP. Nomaindia Mfeketo of the ANC became mayor supported by an ANC-NNP coalition. In 2004, after a dismal showing in the general elections that year, the NNP prepared for dissolution and merger with the ANC, and most of its councillors joined the governing party. This gave the ANC an outright majority on the council, which lasted until the next election.

In the 2006 local government election, the DA was the largest single party, ahead of the ANC, but with no party holding a majority. The new
Independent Democrats (ID) led by Patricia de Lille was in third place. The African Christian Democratic Party (ACDP) initiated negotiations with five other smaller parties who together formed a kingmaker block of fifteen councillors, collectively known as the Multi-Party Forum parties. Despite the ID voting with the ANC, Helen Zille of the DA was elected executive mayor on 15 March 2006 by a very narrow margin with the support of the Multi-Party Forum. Andrew Arnolds of the ACDP was elected executive deputy mayor and Jacob "Dirk" Smit of the Freedom Front Plus (FF+) was elected speaker. The initially fragile position of this new DA-led coalition, also known as the Multi-Party Government, was improved in January 2007 with the introduction of the ID following the expulsion of the small Africa Muslim Party for conspiring with the ANC. As a result of the ID's support, the coalition significantly increased its majority, resulting in a much more stable city government. The ID's Charlotte Williams became executive deputy mayor. However, she resigned just a few months later, and the post then went to Grant Haskin of the ACDP in late 2007. The DA would also bolster its position through by-election victories and floor crossing defections. With the ID and DA together holding a firm council majority, several of the smaller coalition partners were dropped from the city government by the time of the 2009 general elections, including the ACDP and FF+. The DA's Ian Neilson became deputy mayor, while Dirk Smit, who had defected to the DA, retained the position of speaker. Helen Zille left the mayorship the same year to take up the position of premier of the Western Cape, and Dan Plato became mayor.

In 2010, the DA and ID formalized an agreement in which the ID would merge into the DA by 2014. This was prompted in part by the ID's disappointing result in the 2009 general election. As per the agreement, ID ceased to exist at the local level after the 2011 municipal elections with ID members running as DA candidates. DA won a large outright majority in the election, and ID leader Patricia de Lille, who had defeated Plato in an earlier internal election, became the new mayor. The party extended its lead even further to win a two-thirds majority of the seats on the City of Cape Town council in the 2016 municipal elections, and De Lille was thus sworn in to serve a second term. It was however cut short following her resignation on 31 October 2018 after an extended battle with her party over accusations of covering up corruption, accusations she strongly denied. The previous mayor Dan Plato was chosen as her successor.

The DA's Geordin Hill-Lewis was voted in as mayor after the 2021 local government elections.
The following table shows the results of the 2021 election.

By-elections from November 2021
The following by-elections were held to fill vacant ward seats in the period since the election in November 2021.

Demographics

Geography
The municipality has a total area of 2455 km2.

Subdivision varies according to purpose. Main places for census purposes may differ from planning districts.

Main places
The 2001 census divided the municipality into the following main places:

Planning districts
The planning districts are:
Blaauwberg, which includes subdistricts: Atlantis, Blouberg, Mamre, Melkboschstrand, Table View, and parts of Cape Farms, Goodwood, Milnerton, and Maitland.
Cape Flats, which includes subdistricts: Athlone, False Bay Coastal Park, Grassy Park, Guguletu, Hanover Park, Manenberg, Ottery, Pelican Park, and parts of  Muizenberg, Retreat, and Rondebosch.
Helderberg, which includes subdistricts: Gordon's Bay, Macassar, Sir Lowry's Pass ,Somerset West, Stellenbosch Farms and Strand.
Khayelitsha/Mitchells Plain, which includes subdistricts: Blackheath, Blue Downs, Eerste River, Khayelitsha, Mitchell's Plain, and part of Guguletu
Northern, which includes subdistricts: Brackenfell, Durbanville, Eversdal, Joostenbergvlakte, Kenridge, Kraaifontein, Malmesbury Farms, Vredekloof, and Welgemoed.
Southern, which includes subdistricts: Bergvliet, Cape Point, Constantia, Fish Hoek, Hout Bay, Kalk Bay, Kommetjie, Newlands, Noordhoek, Ocean View, Plumstead, Simon's Town, Tokai, Wynberg, parts of Muizenberg, Retreat, Rondebosch, and Table Mountain.    
Table Bay, which includes subdistricts: Camps Bay, Cape Town, Observatory, Pinelands, Robben Island, Sea Point, Signal Hill/Lion's Head, and parts of Epping, Goodwood, Langa, Maitland, and Table Mountain,
Tygerberg, which includes subdistricts: Airport, Bellville, Bishop Lavis, Delft, Elsies River, Kalsteenfontein, Kuils River, Parow, Plattekloof, and parts of Epping, Goodwood, and Milnerton.

Adjacent municipalities
 Swartland Local Municipality, West Coast District Municipality (north)
 Drakenstein Local Municipality, Cape Winelands District Municipality (northeast)
 Stellenbosch Local Municipality, Cape Winelands District Municipality (northeast)
 Theewaterskloof Local Municipality, Overberg District Municipality (east)
 Overstrand Local Municipality, Overberg District Municipality (southeast)
The City of Cape Town is also bounded by the Atlantic Ocean to the south and west.

See also

References

External links
 City of Cape Town official website
 City of Cape Town on the Western Cape Government website

City of Cape Town
Metropolitan Municipalities of South Africa
Municipalities of the Western Cape
Districts of the Western Cape